Lokhim  is village located in  Thulung Dudhkoshi Rural Municipality, Ward No. 9. It is one of the most attractive and culturally rich villages in eastern Nepal. The chairperson of the village is San Kumar Tamang. The village is surrounded with lush greens, flora and fauna. Lokhim is located at approximately 400km south-east of the capital Kathmandu. 

There are majorly four casts are living in Lokhim which includes Rai, Tamang, Sherpa, Biswakarma and few Damai. Each of these community have their own languages, rituals, traditions and culture. Sakela (also known as Toshi) is one of the highly celebrated festival in Lokhim where hundreds of Rai people come together and dance. Sakela (Toshi) is not only important for community bonding but it also has its own historical and cultural importance. Rai community celebrate this festival with joy and zeal. Tamang and Sherpa has celebrate theirs great festival as "Lhochhar". It means 'Lho' refers 'Year' and 'Chhar' refers 'New', together it is 'New Year'. This festival use to celebrate as their changed of Year (Lho). Biswakarma and Damai are minority community in Lokhim.

History 
Lokhim village got its name from the local Rai people. Lo = "Frog" and Khim = "House" which means there house of frogs. In the old days, there were many frogs in this village. So, the local Rai people named the village with frog's story. Lokhim is one of the backwarded villages in the Solukhumbu district. It is located in eastern part of the headquarter Salleri. 

Educational institutions are increasing yearly and five schools are operational. in Solukhumbu District in the Sagarmatha Zone of north-eastern Nepal. At the time of the 1991 Nepal census it had a population of 3098 people living in 585 individual households.

References

External links
UN map of the municipalities of Solukhumbu District/Mohan Tamang

Populated places in Solukhumbu District